Events from the year 1912 in the United Kingdom.

Incumbents
 Monarch – George V
 Prime Minister – H. H. Asquith (Liberal)
 Parliament – 30th

Events

 1 January – General Post Office (GPO) takes over National Telephone Company.
 17 January – British polar explorer Robert Falcon Scott and a team of four reach the South Pole to find that Roald Amundsen had beaten them to it.
 31 January – G. K. Sowerby's drama Rutherford and Son premières at the Royal Court Theatre in London.
 2 February – With Our King and Queen Through India, a 2-hour Kinemacolor feature film of the Delhi Durbar of 1911 made by Charles Urban, is first shown at the Scala Theatre, London.
 26 February–6 April – National coal strike of 1912.
 1 March – suffragettes smash shop windows in the West End of London, especially around Oxford Street.
 16 March – Lawrence Oates, ill member of Scott's South Pole expedition leaves the tent saying, "I am just going outside and may be some time".  He is not seen again.
 19 March – minimum wage introduced for miners after national strike.
 29 March – the remaining members of Scott's expedition die.
 30 March – the University Boat Race on the Thames in London is abandoned after both crews sink.
 1 April – the University Boat Race is restarted, and the race is won by Oxford by six lengths.
 11 April – Irish Home Rule Bill introduced in the House of Commons, but fails to receive the support of the House of Lords.
 13 April – the Royal Flying Corps (RFC) is established by royal charter.
 14–15 April – the RMS Titanic sinks: The White Star liner  strikes an iceberg and sinks on her maiden voyage from the United Kingdom to the United States.
 15 April – the syndicalist Daily Herald newspaper is first published on a permanent basis.
 22 April – English aviator Denys Corbett Wilson completes the first aeroplane crossing of the Irish Sea, from Goodwick in Wales to Crane near Enniscorthy in Ireland.
 April/May – thousands of Jewish workers in London's garment trade in the West End strike, followed by thousands more in the East End inspired by Rudolf Rocker.
 May – Liberal Unionist Party formally merges into the Conservative And Unionist Party.
 2 May–3 July – Board of Trade inquiry into the sinking of the RMS Titanic. 
 5 May–22 July – Great Britain and Ireland compete at the Olympics in Stockholm and win 10 gold, 15 silver and 16 bronze medals.
 13 May – the Air Battalion Royal Engineers becomes the Military Wing of the Royal Flying Corps.
 9 July – Cadeby Main pit disaster: two underground explosions in the South Yorkshire Coalfield kill 91 miners.
 15 July – the National Insurance Act 1911 comes into force introducing National Insurance payments.
 27 July – Bonar Law, leader of the Conservative Party in opposition, makes a defiant speech at a massive Irish Unionist rally at Blenheim Palace against Irish Home Rule implying support for armed resistance to it in Ulster.
 August 
 Cabinet ministers accused of corruption in the Marconi scandal.
 Wettest British August on record.
 10 August – Frank McClean flies a Short Brothers floatplane up the River Thames between the upper and lower parts of Tower Bridge and underneath London Bridge.
 25–27 August – the wet summer climaxes in a major rainstorm across England, causing floods particularly in Norfolk and Norwich.
 September – the tradition of the Blackpool Illuminations begins.
 24 October – formation of the Edinburgh and Leith Branch of the Workers' Educational Association at a meeting addressed by Albert Mansbridge.
 31 October – Robert Baden-Powell marries Olave St Clair Soames at Parkstone.
 5 November – establishment of the British Board of Film Censors.
 12 November – the bodies of Captain Scott and his team are found in the Antarctic.
 27 November – concerted suffragette attacks on pillar boxes.
 18 December – Piltdown Man, thought to be the fossilised remains of a hitherto unknown form of early human, presented to the Geological Society of London. It is revealed to be a hoax in 1953.

Undated
 Sir Rufus Isaacs, the Attorney General, becomes the first believing Jew appointed to the Cabinet.
 Judges' Rules are issued by the judges of the King's Bench to give English police forces guidance on the procedures to be followed in detaining and questioning suspects.
 Glucozade, the predecessor of Lucozade, is first produced.

Publications
 Walter de la Mare's The Listeners, and Other Poems.
 Ethel M. Dell's first novel The Way of an Eagle.
 Arthur Conan Doyle's novel The Lost World.
 The first Georgian Poetry anthology Georgian Poetry 1911–12 edited by Edward Marsh.
 Alfred North Whitehead and Bertrand Russell's book Principia Mathematica vol. 2, one of the most important and seminal works in mathematical logic and philosophy.

Births
 16 January – Norman Gash, historian (born in India; died 2009)
 17 January – Edward Fennessy, electrical engineer (died 2009)
 19 January – Margaret Wingfield, politician (died 2002)
 20 January – Reg Smith, footballer and football manager (died 2004)
 21 January – Laurence Whistler, poet and artist (died 2000)
 3 February – John Bryan Ward-Perkins, archaeologist (died 1981)
 6 February – Christopher Hill, historian (died 2003)
 8 February 
Ann Lambton, historian (died 2008)
Richard Southern, historian (died 2001)
 12 February
 Eric Barker, comedy actor (died 1990)
 Gabrielle Brune, actress (died 2005)
 11 February – Roy Fuller, poet and novelist (died 1991)
 13 February 
 Jenny Laird, actress (died 2001)
 Margaretta Scott, actress (died 2005)
 20 February – Olive Cook, writer and artist (died 2002)
 27 February – Lawrence Durrell, writer (born in India; died 1990)
 4 March – Judith Furse, character actress (died 1974) 
 5 March – David Astor, editor of The Observer newspaper (died 2001)
 10 March
Muriel Angelus, actress (died 2004)
Frank Smithies, mathematician (died 2002)
 14 March – Vernon Harrison, photographer (died 2001)
 19 March – Bill Frankland, immunologist (died 2020)
 23 March – Betty Astell, actress (died 2005)
 25 March – Melita Norwood, née Sirnis, secret agent (died 2005)
 27 March
 James Callaghan, Prime Minister (died 2005)
 John Crofton, medical pioneer (died 2009)
 29 March – Constance Chapman, actress (died 2003) 
 5 April 
 John Le Mesurier, actor (died 1983)
 Bill Roberts, athlete (died 2001)
 18 April – Sandy Glen, explorer (died 2004)
 22 April – Kathleen Ferrier, contralto (died 1953)
 4 May – Frith Banbury, actor and theatre director (died 2008)
 7 May – Frank Reginald Carey, fighter pilot (died 2004)
 10 May – Edward Gardner, politician (died 2001)
 17 May – Percy M. Young, musicologist and composer (died 2004)
 19 May – Noel Mander, organ builder (died 2005)
 22 May – Herbert C. Brown, chemist, Nobel Prize laureate (died 2004)
 28 May – Derek Cooper, soldier and campaigner for refugees (died 2007)
 31 May – Alfred Deller, countertenor (died 1979)
 8 June – Wilhelmina Barns-Graham, artist (died 2004)
 9 June – Gerald James Whitrow, mathematician and cosmologist (died 2000)
 10 June – William Gordon Harris, civil engineer (died 2005)
 16 June – Enoch Powell, politician (died 1998)
 19 June – Archie Butterworth, racing car designer (died 2005)
 20 June 
 Anthony Buckeridge, children's author (died 2004)
 Olive Hirst, advertising agent (died 1994)
 23 June – Alan Turing, mathematician (died 1954)
 24 June 
 Brian Johnston, BBC cricket commentator (died 1994)
 Mary Wesley, novelist (died 2002)
 30 June – Arthur Walter James, journalist and Liberal Party politician (died 2015)
 11 July – Peta Taylor, cricketer (died 1989)
 12 July – Joseph Gold, lawyer (died 2000)
 17 July – Michael Gilbert, lawyer and crime fiction writer (died 2006)
 21 July – Tommy Butler, Detective Chief Superintendent (died 1970)
 30 July – Anne Ridler, poet and editor (died 2001)
 31 July – Peter John Stephens, writer (died 2002)
 7 August – Paul Hawkins, politician (died 2002)
 13 August – Terence Wilmot Hutchison, economist (died 2007)
 15 August – Wendy Hiller, actress (died 2003)
 16 August – Ted Drake, footballer (died 1995)
 17 August – Margaret Scriven, tennis player (died 2001)
 26 August – Alex Stuart-Menteth, naval officer (died 2000)
 28 August – George Alcock, astronomer (died 2000)
 1 September – Gwynfor Evans, Welsh politician (died 2005)
 2 September – David Daiches, literary critic (died 2005)
 11 September – Robin Jenkins, novelist (died 2005)
 18 September – Frank Farmer, physicist (died 2004)
 28 September – Peter Finch, actor (died 1977)
 2 October – Eric Wilson, soldier (died 2008)
 10 October – Clare Fell, archaeologist (died 2002)
 12 October – Doreen Gorsky, politician and television producer (died 2001)
 24 October – Peter Gellhorn, composer and conductor (born in Germany; died 2004)
 27 October – Grahame Farr, maritime historian (died 1983)
 28 October – Richard Doll, physiologist (died 2005)
 30 October – Ian Robertson, Lord Robertson, judge (died 2005)
 5 November – Paul Dehn, screenwriter and poet (died 1976)
 7 November – Alex Henshaw, test pilot (died 2007)
 12 November – Kenneth Porter, Air Force officer (died 2003)
 13 November – John Hill, politician (died 2007)
 25 November – Francis Durbridge, playwright and author (died 1998)
 14 December – Desmond Fitzpatrick, general (died 2002)
 27 December
 Conroy Maddox, painter (died 2005)
 Cyril Philips, historian (died 2005)

Deaths
 7 January – Sophia Jex-Blake, physician and feminist (born 1840)
 14 January – Samuel Waite Johnson, railway locomotive engineer (Midland Railway) (born 1831)
 24 January – James Allen, self-help writer and poet (born 1864)
 29 January – Alexander Duff, 1st Duke of Fife, Scottish aristocrat and politician (born 1849)
 10 February – Joseph Lister, surgeon (born 1827)
 13 February – Princess Victor of Hohenlohe-Langenburg (born 1832)
 17 February – Edgar Evans, Welsh-born naval officer, member of the Scott expedition to the South Pole (born 1876)
 21 February – Osborne Reynolds, physicist (born 1842)
 28 February – Bill Storer, footballer and cricketer (born 1867)
 1 March – George Grossmith, actor and comic writer (born 1847)
 17 March – Lawrence Oates, army officer, member of the Scott expedition (born 1880)
 29 March – remaining members of the Scott expedition: 
 Henry Robertson Bowers, Scottish-born naval officer (born 1883) 
 Robert Falcon Scott, naval officer and explorer (born 1868) 
 Edward Wilson, physician and naturalist (born 1872) 
 15 April – some victims of the sinking of the RMS Titanic:
 Thomas Andrews, Jr., shipbuilder (born 1873)
 Dai Bowen, boxer (born 1891)
 Thomas Byles, Catholic priest (born 1870)
 Sidney Leslie Goodwin, youngest victim (born 1910)
 Wallace Hartley, ship's band leader and violinist (born 1878)
 William McMaster Murdoch, First Officer (born 1873) 
 Jack Phillips, ship's senior wireless officer (born 1887)
 Edward Smith, ship's captain (born 1850)
 William Thomas Stead, campaigning journalist (born 1849)
 20 April – Bram Stoker, writer (born 1847)
 24 April – Justin McCarthy, Irish nationalist politician, historian and novelist (born 1830)
 21 May – Sir Julius Wernher, businessman and art collector (born 1850 in Germany)
 13 June – Alice Diehl, novelist and concert pianist (born 1844)
 24 June – Sir George White, field marshal (born 1835)
 25 June – Sir Lawrence Alma-Tadema, painter (born 1836 in the Netherlands)
 2 July – Tom Richardson, cricketer (born 1870)
 20 July – Andrew Lang, Scottish poet, novelist and critic (born 1844)
 31 July – Allan Octavian Hume, civil servant and ornithologist in India (born 1829)
 13 August – Octavia Hill, social reformer (born 1838)
 20 August
 William Booth, founder of the Salvation Army (born 1829)
 Walter Goodman, painter, illustrator and author (born 1838)
 1 September – Samuel Coleridge-Taylor, composer (born 1875)
 6 September – Sir Charles Gough, general and Victoria Cross recipient (born 1832)
 28 September – Frederick Richards, admiral (born 1833)
 30 September – Frances Allitsen, song composer (born 1848)
 8 November – Dugald Drummond, Scottish-born railway locomotive engineer (born 1840)
 17 November – Richard Norman Shaw, architect (born 1831)
 25 November – Sir Edward Moss, theatrical impresario (born 1852)
 14 December – Belgrave Edward Sutton Ninnis, explorer and officer, lost on Antarctic expedition (born 1887)

See also
 List of British films before 1920

References

 
Years of the 20th century in the United Kingdom